Fleet Admiral Vladimir Ivanovich Kuroyedov (born 5 September 1944) is a former longest-serving Commander-in-Chief of the Russian Navy. Earlier he was Chief of Staff/1st Deputy Commander of the Baltic Fleet, Chief of Staff/1st Deputy Commander of the Pacific Fleet since 1993 and Chief of the Main Staff/1st Deputy Commander-in-Chief of the Navy. Kuroyedov graduated from the Pacific S.O. Makarov Higher Naval School, the N. G. Kuznetsov Naval Academy and the General Staff Academy.

Kuroyedov joined the navy in 1962, graduating from the S.O. Makarov Pacific Higher Naval School in 1967.  He served aboard frigates in the Pacific Fleet. In 1976–78 he studied at the Grechko (now Kuznetsov) Naval Academy graduating with distinction. From 1979 to 1987 he served in the Pacific Fleet commanding a division of minesweepers and was Chief of Staff of the Sakhalin Flotilla. From 1987 to 1989 he studied at the Voroshilov General Staff Academy graduating with the gold medal and was promoted to rear admiral.

In 1993 he became Chief of Staff of the Baltic Fleet and became Commander of the Pacific Fleet in 1994. He became Chief of the Main Navy Staff in 1997 and was promoted to Commander-in-Chief of the Russian Navy in November 1997. Kuroyedov was promoted to Fleet Admiral in February 2000. Kuroyedov tendered his resignation in the wake of the Kursk submarine disaster but his resignation was refused.

He was retired one day before his 61st birthday in 2005, mandatory retirement age for Russian senior officers being 60 (though the President can extend their service tenure in one year increments until 64).

Conflicting views on Kuroyedov's retirement speculate either that he was fired because he had presided over too many naval embarrassments, including the sinking of Kursk or because the President wished to emphasize the need for greater discipline in the Navy.

Honours and awards
 Order of Merit for the Fatherland, classes 3 and 4
 Order of Military Merit (1996)
 Order for Service to the Homeland in the Armed Forces of the USSR, 3rd class (1990)
 Jubilee Medal "300 Years of the Russian Navy"
 Medal "In Commemoration of the 850th Anniversary of Moscow"
 Medal "For Military Valour" 1st class (Min Def)
 Medal "For Strengthening Military Cooperation" (Min Def)
 Medal "For diligence in carrying out engineering support tasks" (Min Def)
 Medal "200 Years of the Ministry of Defence" (Min Def)
 Jubilee Medal "In Commemoration of the 100th Anniversary of the Birth of Vladimir Ilyich Lenin"
 Jubilee Medal "Thirty Years of Victory in the Great Patriotic War 1941–1945"
 Medal "Veteran of the Armed Forces of the USSR"
 Jubilee Medal "50 Years of the Armed Forces of the USSR"
 Jubilee Medal "60 Years of the Armed Forces of the USSR"
 Jubilee Medal "70 Years of the Armed Forces of the USSR"
 Medal "For Impeccable Service" 1st, 2nd and 3rd classes

References

 Biography (in Russian)
 Куроедов, Владимир Иванович в Большой биографической энциклопедии (Large Biographic Encyclopaedia - in Russian)
 Biography - in Russian - and photo on website ladno.ru
 Biography - in Russian - on website viperson.ru

1944 births
Living people
People from Khasansky District
Russian admirals
Commanders-in-chief of the Russian Navy
Soviet Navy personnel
Recipients of the Order "For Merit to the Fatherland", 3rd class
Recipients of the Order of Military Merit (Russia)
N. G. Kuznetsov Naval Academy alumni
Military Academy of the General Staff of the Armed Forces of the Soviet Union alumni